Khalilan (also Romanized as Khalīlān and Khalilyan; Khalīlān-e Varzal) is a village in Jirdeh Rural District, in the Central District of Shaft County, Gilan Province, Iran. At the 2006 census, its population was 463, in 110 families.

References 

Populated places in Shaft County